Sanford is an unincorporated community in the Rural Municipality of Macdonald in Manitoba.

Sanford lies approximately 12 kilometres southwest of the provincial capital, Winnipeg.  While it is generally considered a bedroom community with many residents commuting to Winnipeg for work, Sanford is also home to many farming families and small businesses.  These businesses include the grocery store, the liquor/lumber store, Family Physio Therapy, carwash, insurance, accounting, and construction service provided.  Sanford is also home to Meadowbrook (a small retirement community), a United Church, and a Recreation Center.

Sanford is the site of the Water Treatment Plant that serves the R.M. of Macdonald.

Demographics 

Education

Sanford Collegiate educates approximately 300 students, ranging from 9th to 12th grade.  Many students are bused in from surrounding communities including LaSalle, Oak Bluff, Domain, Starbuck, and Brunkild. The principal of the Sanford Collegiate is Ms. Jaynie Burnell and the vice-principal is Ryan Ogilvie.

J.A. Cuddy School houses kindergarten to grade 8 students, and also has a daycare facility. The principal of J.A. Cuddy school is Mr. Scott Thomson. 
J.A. Cuddy school was named after Dr. James A. Cuddy. He was born in the Sanford area in 1892, where he also received his elementary schooling. Later in life, he spent more than 20 years as a member of the Manitoba School Trustees Association and was president for six years. He sat on the advisory board of education from 1946 to 1949 and was a member and vice-chairman of the Manitoba Teachers Pension Fund from 1948 to 1959, plus a member of two provincial municipal committees of the legislature for three years. In 1952, the University of Manitoba recognized his services to the province by bestowing an Honorary LL.D. (doctor of laws) on him. In 1953, he was awarded the coronation medal by Queen Elizabeth. Outside the front of the school, there is an old school bell. This bell was the original bell from the Sanford Consolidated School, built in 1914. This bell used to be rung every day, but now it sits as a symbol, in front of the school, as a monument to the school's history. 
Due to an increased number of students, the school expanded to include four new classrooms, a new computer lab, and a large new gym. The school playground includes a play structure, swing set, soccer field, and baseball diamond.

High-School Sports

The premier sport at Sanford Collegiate is hockey.

Men's team Championships: 2013-14 and 2017-18 Winnipeg Free Press Division Champions

References

Designated places in Manitoba
Unincorporated communities in Manitoba